Pardalophora is a genus of Nearctic band-winged grasshoppers in the family Acrididae. There are at least four living species in Pardalophora.

Species
The Orthoptera Species File lists:
 Pardalophora apiculata (Harris, 1835) (coral-winged grasshopper)
 Pardalophora haldemanii (Scudder, 1872) (Haldeman's grasshopper)
 †Pardalophora hungarica Poncrácz, 1928
 Pardalophora phoenicoptera (Burmeister, 1838) (orange-winged grasshopper)
 Pardalophora saussurei (Scudder, 1892) (Saussure's grasshopper)

References

Further reading

 
 

Oedipodinae